Heliocis is a genus of false blister beetles in the family Oedemeridae. There is one described species in Heliocis, H. repanda.

References

Further reading

 
 

Oedemeridae
Monotypic beetle genera
Tenebrionoidea genera
Articles created by Qbugbot